The 1997 World's Strongest Man was the 20th edition of World's Strongest Man and was won by Jouko Ahola from Finland. It was his first title. Flemming Rasmussen from Denmark finished second after finishing fourth the previous year, and Magnus Samuelsson from Sweden finished third. Three time defending champion Magnus Ver Magnusson, chasing a fourth straight title and record fifth overall, was eliminated in the qualifying heats. The contest was held in Primm Valley Resort, Nevada.

Heats

Group 1

Group 2

Group 3

Group 4

Group USA

The USA Group was actually the inaugural America's Strongest Man contest and took place at the Primm Valley Resort several weeks before the other qualifying heats.

Final results

See also
America's Strongest Man

References

External links
 Official site
 1997 results at Bill Henderson's Strongest Man site

World's Strongest Man
Worlds Strongest Man, 1997